Miloš Brezinský (born 2 April 1984 in Trenčín) is a Slovak former football defender.

Poli Timișoara
He signed with FC Timişoara in the summer of 2008. On 23 July 2010, he was released from his contract.

Honours

Club
Sparta Prague
Czech Cup: 2007–08
Viktoria Plzeň
Czech League: 2010–11
Czech Supercup: 2011

International
Slovakia U20
2003 FIFA U-20 World Cup: Participation
Slovakia U19
 2002 UEFA European Under-19 Football Championship – Third place

References

External links
 
 
 
 iDNES.cz profile

1984 births
Living people
Sportspeople from Trenčín
Slovak footballers
FK Mladá Boleslav players
MŠK Rimavská Sobota players
FC Politehnica Timișoara players
SK Kladno players
FC Slovan Liberec players
AC Sparta Prague players
FC Viktoria Plzeň players
SK Dynamo České Budějovice players
FC Akzhayik players
ŠKF Sereď players
Slovak Super Liga players
1. FC Tatran Prešov players
Slovakia international footballers
Slovakia youth international footballers
Expatriate footballers in the Czech Republic
Slovak expatriate sportspeople in the Czech Republic
Expatriate footballers in Romania
Slovak expatriate sportspeople in Romania
Expatriate footballers in Austria
Slovak expatriate sportspeople in Austria
Expatriate footballers in Kazakhstan
Slovak expatriate sportspeople in Kazakhstan
Czech First League players
Liga I players
Association football central defenders